Bodola may refer to
Budila, a commune in Romania
György Bodola (died 2007), Hungarian illustrator 
Iuliu Bodola (1912–1992), Romanian association football striker
Stadionul Iuliu Bodola in Oradea, Romania